Esparreguera is a municipality in Catalonia, in the province of Barcelona, Spain. It is situated in the comarca of el Baix Llobregat. 

Esparreguera is famous in Catalonia for staging a grand version of the play Life and Passion of Jesus Christ every year in March and April, on the Sundays before and after Easter. The play is popularly known as La Passió d'Esparreguera. Over 300 actors, 50 technicians and 100 musicians participate in the play during five acts, twenty scenographic settings and more than five hours of drama, from the election of the apostles until the resurrection of Jesus.

The grand scale of the show is achieved with the volunteer contribution of the citizens of the town, in a tradition that dates back to Esparreguera's medieval origins. This tradition has made Esparreguera one of the cradles of Catalan performing arts, giving birth to actors such as the sisters Anna and Lola Lizaran, or the contemporary dancer Ramon Oller. The Shakira's music video for Empire was filmed in Esparreguera too.

References

External links
 Government data pages 

Municipalities in Baix Llobregat